Maneshwara is a village in Sindhupalchok District in the Bagmati Zone of central Nepal. At the time of the 1991 Nepal census, it had a population of 3,065, and had 642 houses in the village.
 the population had become 3,393 (1,816 females and 1,577 males) in 789 households.

References

Populated places in Sindhupalchowk District